Partido Barug, commonly known as BARUG, is a regional political party based in Cebu City, Philippines. Cebu City mayor Michael Rama is its founding president.

BARUG is currently affiliated with PDP–Laban since 2018. It has formed an alliance with Kugi Uswag Sugbo and Partido Panaghiusa for the 2022 elections.

History 
Originally called as "Team Rama" and later "BARUG Team Rama", the party was formed in 2012 to support the candidacy of then mayor Michael Rama, who bolted from Bando Osmeña – Pundok Kauswagan on June 2, 2011.

The group was accredited as a political party by the Commission on Elections on 2018 and changed its name from "Barug Team Rama" to "Partido Barug".

Electoral history

2013 local elections 
In the 2013 elections, BARUG was allied with United Nationalist Alliance.

They won four seats in the Cebu City Council along with its candidates for mayor, Michael Rama and for vice mayor, Edgardo Labella.

2016 local elections 
In the 2016 elections, BARUG kept its alliance with United Nationalist Alliance endorsing then vice president Jejomar Binay and then senator Gregorio Honasan for president and vice president, respectively.

They won ten seats in the Cebu City Council along with its candidate for vice mayor, Edgardo Labella.

2019 local elections 
In the 2019 elections, BARUG withdrew its alliance with United Nationalist Alliance and allied itself with PDP–Laban after several of its members joined the latter.

They won eight seats in the Cebu City Council along with its candidates for mayor, Edgardo Labella and for vice mayor, Michael Rama.

2022 local elections 
After the death of Mayor Labella on November 19, 2021, Rama ascended to the mayorship while Councilor Dondon Hontiveros became the new vice mayor. Barug nominated former councilor Jocelyn "Joy" Pesquera to fill Hontiveros' vacated seat. She was formally appointed by President Rodrigo Duterte on February 11, 2022.

In the 2022 elections, BARUG continued to align itself with PDP–Laban. The party initially endorsed incumbent senator Bong Go and incumbent Davao City mayor Sara Duterte for president and vice president, respectively. On November 30, 2021, Go withdrew his bid for the presidency prompting BARUG to choose a new presidential bet. On January 26, 2022, they declared their support for the presidential campaign of former senator Bongbong Marcos.

Electoral performance

Mayor

Vice mayor

House of Representatives

Cebu City

City council

See also 
Political parties in Cebu City:
 Bando Osmeña – Pundok Kauswagan
 Kugi Uswag Sugbo
 Partido Panaghiusa

Notes

References 

Local political parties in the Philippines
Regionalist parties
Regionalist parties in the Philippines
Politics of Cebu City